Micro-inequity is a theory regarding ways in which individuals are either singled out, overlooked, ignored, or otherwise discounted based on unchangeable characteristics such as race or gender. 
Micro-inequities, micro-affirmations, and micro-advantages all fall within the broader category of micro-messaging. All three represent ways to send subtle messages, negatively or positively.

Theory overview 
According to the theory, micro-inequities are subtle, often sent unconsciously or consciously, messages that devalue, discourage and impair workplace performance. They are conveyed through facial expressions, gestures, tone of voice, choice of words, nuance and syntax. Repeated sending, or receiving, of micro-inequities can erode commitment and loyalty, and have the cumulative effect of disintegrating performance within the group.  As they are characteristically subtle, "only the most astute and aware communicators recognize how [micro-messages] are received and perceived," as described in The Star-Ledger article, "Micro-messages Matter" by Steve Adubato.

These messages can reveal more about the true nature of a relationship than the surface words alone. They function as the core of how unconscious bias is communicated and how workplace inclusion is experienced. In the Profiles in Diversity Journal article "The DNA of Culture Change", Joyce Tucker states, "Organizations have done a great job at controlling the big, easily-seen offensive behaviours but have been somewhat blind to what is rarely observed. Organizations have done great work at controlling the few elephants while being overrun by a phalanx of ants. Listening with your arms folded, losing eye contact with the person you're speaking with, or even how you move your lips to shape a smile—in any given conversation, we may send hundreds of messages, often without even saying a word. Just as television or radio waves surround us yet we never see them, these micro-messages are just as pervasive and nearly as difficult to discern."

Origin 

Mary Rowe of MIT coined the terms micro-inequities and micro-affirmations in 1973. She was building on original research by Chester Pierce about micro-aggressions, which originally focused on racism and behaviour that could easily be seen as hostile. Originally the papers were named the "Saturn's rings phenomenon"; because the planet Saturn is surrounded by rings made just of tiny bits of ice and sand that can still partially obscure the planet. Some of these papers were published in whole or in part in 1974 and thereafter (see References below). A relatively complete version came out in 1990: "Barriers to Equality: The Power of Subtle Discrimination", Employee Responsibilities and Rights Journal, June 1990, Vol. 3, No. 2, pp. 153–163. Rowe published a longer article "Micro-affirmations and Micro-inequities" in the Journal of the International Ombudsman Association, which includes more of her hypotheses about the importance of micro-affirmations. Works done earlier in the same genre include that of Jean-Paul Sartre who wrote about small acts of anti-Semitism, and Chester Pierce who wrote about "micro-aggressions" as acts of racism, and "childish" as acts against children.

Mary Rowe's original research studied the impact micro-messages have on the academic community and relationships in society in general in the United States and around the world. The first broad introduction of micro-inequities in the corporate workplace was initiated in 2002 by Insight Education Systems.  It established the inextricable link between micro-messaging and corporate diversity and inclusion initiatives.

Definition 
In the original articles on this subject in the 1970s (see references below), Mary Rowe defined micro-inequities as "apparently small events which are often ephemeral and hard-to-prove, events which are covert, often unintentional, frequently unrecognized by the perpetrator, which occur wherever people are perceived to be different." She wrote about homophobia, reactions to perceived disabilities, reactions to the way people look, reverse discrimination against white and Black males in traditionally female environments and many varieties of religious slights. She collected instances of micro-inequities anywhere at work or in communities—anywhere in the world—that people are perceived to be "different."

These differences indeed reach beyond unchangeable characteristics such as race or gender. In his book,  "Micro messaging: Why Great Leadership is Beyond Words" (2006 McGraw-Hill), Stephen Young describes the damaging impact micro-inequities have on an individual's workplace performance through additional factors, such as one's political views, marital status, tenure, style, resistance to comply with status quo and other characteristics that are changeable.

Young states that these drivers of unconscious bias reflect the positions people hold about others that are influenced by past experiences forming filters that cause conclusions to be reached, about groups or ethnicities, through methods other than active thought or reasoning. The critical limitation of unconscious bias is that it is a concept, a state of mind and therefore not actionable.  One cannot "do" an unconscious bias. The only way unconscious biases are manifested is through the subtle messages we send—typically, micro-inequities that affect the performance of others.

Micro-affirmations and micro-advantages 
A micro-affirmation, in Rowe's writing, is the reverse phenomenon. Micro-affirmations are subtle or apparently small acknowledgements of a person's value and accomplishments. They may take the shape of public recognition of the person, "opening a door," referring positively to the work of a person, commending someone on the spot, or making a happy introduction. Apparently, "small" affirmations form the basis of successful mentoring, effective networks, successful colleague-ships and of most caring relationships. They may lead to greater self-esteem and improved performance. In 2015, Rowe collected her hypotheses about the potential power of micro-affirmations:

  "Blocking unconscious bias: We could try to practice—all the time—affirming the achievements of others. If we always look for excellence in the work of others and are universally respectful, may we be able to block our own unconscious bias?
  Ameliorate damage: Can micro-affirmations (for example in affinity groups and mentoring programs) make up for some of the damage caused by unconscious bias?
   Meeting a core emotional concern: Since research suggests that appreciation and affirmation are core concerns for all of us, may this plan help in making the workplace more productive?
   Evoking reciprocal affirmation: Since research suggests an impulse toward "reciprocity," may affirming behaviour spread, as we respond to support from others?
   A possible role modelling effect: Research suggests that people are sensitive to the morale and happiness of those around them, and especially sensitive to the behaviour of a local manager. If managers, bystanders, and others are role models for affirming behaviour, will some others follow suit? Peers and bystanders are often the most important actors because they are most likely to be present where people act in a biased fashion.
   Rectifying our own unconscious bias: Research suggests that behaviour follows attitudes. Attitudes also can be changed by behaviour. If we consciously improve our behaviour may we lessen our unconscious bias?"

In 2021 Mary Rowe wrote of the profound importance of micro-affirmations in building a sense of "belonging." <https://mitsloan.mit.edu/shared/ods/documents?PublicationDocumentID=7871>

There is a difference between the concepts of "inequality" and "inequity." An inequality implies there is some comparison being made. For example, if a boss doesn't listen attentively to an employee, that in and of itself is not a micro-inequality. However, if the boss listens attentively to all of an employee's coworkers but not that employee, that might be a micro-inequality.

An inequity, by contrast, is simply something (that may be perceived to be) unfair or unjust under the circumstances. Thus a micro-inequity may occur with only one person on the scene if that person is treated in an unfair or unjust manner. (Of course, it is possible and even likely that many micro-inequities support or lead to an unequal environment for people of a given group, but the two concepts are different.)

A micro-affirmation may, in a similar fashion, refer to "only one" person and does not, in and of itself, imply any sense of advantage over others, but rather support and inspiration and encouragement to the individual who is affirmed.

An alternate perspective to Mary Rowe's "reverse phenomenon" of micro-affirmations theory is Stephen Young's introduction of a third layer, micro-advantages. Micro-advantages are subtle, often unconscious, messages that motivate, inspire and enhance workplace performance. Like micro-inequities, they are conveyed through facial expressions, gestures, tone of voice, choice of words, nuance and syntax. Applied effectively, micro-advantages can unlock employee potential, enabling one's engagement, creativity, loyalty and performance. Micro-advantages are central to effective leadership. An affirmation is a statement asserting existence or truth in a way that helps the person affirmed; a micro-advantage is a subtle message that motivates and inspires performance in the workplace or classroom.

Micro-affirmations and micro-advantages are believed to enhance an individual's engagement and overall performance.

In culture 

Micro-inequities can be seen with regard to race and religion, colour, disability, sexual identity, social class and national origin. Some are embodied in language that links certain derogatory stereotypes with a particular race. Examples of such micro-inequities would be the terms "an Indian giver" and "to gyp", or the phrase "to Jew down". Other examples include the casual use of the term "she" while referring to individuals in occupations that have been predominantly women, such as teachers, nurses and secretaries, and the disrespect sometimes exhibited toward fathers as full-time homemakers.

Elimination of micro-inequities is a current focus of some universities, businesses and government agencies, as a key diversity strategy. Micro-inequities can slowly and methodically erode a person's motivation and sense of worth according to some experts. This may result in absenteeism, poor employee retention and loss of productivity. In the article, "Sizing Up What's Really Being Said" in The Sacramento Bee, nine techniques are outlined that help minimize the negative effect of micro-inequities.

Modern media are also responsible for the perpetuation of micro-inequities. People of colour have been portrayed negatively; eminent people of colour are poorly represented in Western media. Examples would include a too-common belief that African Americans are the majority of those on welfare in the US. Many Native Americans are sensitive to the idea that "Columbus discovered" the land they lived in. Feagin and Benokraitis note that the mass media has portrayed women negatively in many respects; for example, women are portrayed as sexual objects in many music videos.

In Julie Rawe's Time Magazine article "Why Your Boss May Be Sweating the Small Stuff", she outlines many of the workplace applications of micro-inequities and the ways they influence performance. Rawe states, "It used to be  that [micro-inequities were] tone-deaf moments used to buttress discrimination claims. Now they are becoming the basis for [validating] those claims."

There are distinct differences between the effects of micro-messaging in the academic community versus the corporate workplace. Students, by and large, rely on being the recipients of the knowledge provided by the educator. In the workplace, it is a collaborative environment where leaders rely and depend on, the knowledge and skills of team members. Raising the knowledge of micro-messaging in the corporate sector can "make even hardened executives recognize themselves, or at the very least, their superiors" as senders of micro-inequities, according to Young. Since micro-inequities represent each person's status quo of behaviour, it normally requires experiential examples on the receiving side to understand their impact on altering performance. Both Stephen Young and Mary Rowe agree "a good way to deal with micro-inequities is to bring them to the forefront through discussion".

Further research and controversy 

Mary Rowe defined micro-inequities as "small events that may be ephemeral and hard to prove" and stated that "it is not easy to measure the effects of gender micro-inequities, because effects of unfair behaviour may differ by context."  There is a growing body of scholarly research on unconscious bias.  Much of the modern approach has been to use an Implicit Association Test rather than Questionnaires or interviews.  However, many scholars have published articles and analyses doubting the efficacy and validity of this research.

A book on the same subject was written pseudonymously in the late 1970s by Mary Howell, MD, of Harvard Medical School. Under the name of "Margaret Campbell, MD" Howell wrote, "Why Would a 'Girl' Want to go into Medicine?"

Wesley Profit wrote his Harvard doctoral thesis on the micro-inequities of racism. Ellen Spertus, an MIT student at the time, did a small study, "Why Are There So Few Female Computer Scientists?", MIT Artificial Intelligence Laboratory Technical Report 1315, August 1991. This is one of many such studies from various departments at MIT.

Frances K. Conley, then of Stanford Medical School, published "Walking Out on the Boys" in 1998, which deals with her experience as a woman neurosurgeon, and sexism in the medical profession. Stephen Young uses the concept of "micro-advantages," rather than "micro-affirmations." He published "Micro-Messaging" in 2006 (McGraw-Hill). Scholarly works include "Why So Slow? The Advancement of Women" by Virginia Valian, MIT Press, 1999, and  the article "What Knowers Know Well: Women, Work, and the Academy," Alison Wylie, University of Washington, 2009.

Recently, there has been a great deal of work being done by various consultants, experts doing research in the social sciences and in neuroscience, and leaders in the field of diversity. After earning a communications degree from Emerson College, Stephen Young entered finance and eventually became senior vice president of JP Morgan Chase, managing the firm's global diversity strategy. Inspired by MIT Professor Mary P. Rowe's decades of research into what she called "microinequities" in colleges and the workplace, he became a consultant and developed seminars to sensitize executives to the full range of what he calls "micro-messages." Young's company, Insight Education Systems, founded in 2002, has helped implement his program at Starbucks, Raytheon, Cisco, IBM, Merck, and other Fortune 500 corporations.

Various ideas are put forward regularly in an attempt to mitigate unconscious bias:

 Groups are taught how to recognize, prevent and deal with possible errors made by individuals;
 "Active bystander" training often includes discussions of the importance of peers and bystanders in affirming equitable environments.
 Facts are collected, rather than opinions, about judgments that are to be made;
 Judgments made in the past are reviewed periodically and objectively;
 Teaching the habits of micro-affirmations may help in preventing micro-inequities from happening in the first place. This is especially important with respect to preventing errors in judgment that can arise from selective perception and other manifestations of unconscious bias.

References

Rowe, Mary, "Saturn's Rings: a study of the minutiae of sexism which maintain discrimination and inhibit affirmative action results in corporations and non-profit institutions" in Graduate and Professional Education of Women, American Association of University Women, 1974, pp. 1–9.
Rowe, Mary, "Saturn's Rings II, with racist and sexist incidents from 1974 and 1975," in the Harvard Medical Alumni Bulletin, Volume 50, No. 1 (September/October 1975), pp. 14–18, and in Bourne, Patricia and Velma Parness, eds., Proceedings of the NSF Conference on Women's Leadership and Authority, University of California, Santa Cruz, California, 1977, also reprinted in Comment, Vol. 10, No 3 (March 1978), p. 3.
Rowe, Mary, "The Minutiae of Discrimination:  The Need for Support," in Forisha, Barbara and Barbara Goldman, Outsiders on the Inside, Women in Organizations, Prentice-Hall, Inc., New Jersey, 1981, Ch. 11, pp. 155–171.
Rowe, Mary, "Barriers to Equality:  the Power of Subtle Discrimination,"  The Employee Responsibilities and Rights Journal, June, 1990,  Vol. 3, No. 2,  pp. 153–163
Rowe, Mary, "Unconscious Bias: May Micro-Affirmations Provide one Answer?" in Commentary, 

Discrimination
Anthropology